Jamie Robert Duncan (born July 20, 1975) is a former American football linebacker in the NFL. He was drafted by the Tampa Bay Buccaneers in the 1998 NFL Draft. He also played for the St. Louis Rams and Atlanta Falcons.

A two time All-American and the 1997 Southeastern Conference Defensive Player of the Year, Duncan starred for the Commodores from 1994-97 before being selected in the third round of the 1998 NFL Draft by the Tampa Bay Buccaneers. He became a starter for Tampa Bay in 2000 when Hardy Nickerson left via free agency. Duncan's NFL career lasted seven-years that included stops in Tampa and St. Louis before his final stop in Atlanta in 2004.

In 2009, he was selected to be honored as one of the SEC's Legends of the Game.

He currently resides in Tampa, Florida.

References 

1975 births
Living people
American football middle linebackers
Tampa Bay Buccaneers players
St. Louis Rams players
Atlanta Falcons players
Vanderbilt Commodores football players